is a passenger railway station located in the city of Ōtsu, Shiga Prefecture, Japan, operated by the private railway company Keihan Electric Railway.

Lines

Station layout
The station consists of two opposed unnumbered side platforms connected by a level crossing. The station is unattended.

Platforms

Adjacent stations

History
Minami-Shiga Station was opened on May 15, 1927.

Passenger statistics
In fiscal 2018, the station was used by an average of 1134 passengers daily (boarding passengers only).

Surrounding area
Otsu City Shiga Civic Center
Otsu Minamishiga Post Office
Otsu Municipal Shiga Elementary School

See also
List of railway stations in Japan

References

External links

Keihan official home page

Railway stations in Shiga Prefecture
Stations of Keihan Electric Railway
Railway stations in Japan opened in 1927
Railway stations in Ōtsu